Lahrud Rural District is in Meshgin-e Sharqi  District of Meshgin Shahr County, Ardabil province, Iran. At the census of 2006, its population was 5,630 in 1,373 households; there were 3,928 inhabitants in 1,177 households at the following census of 2011; and in the most recent census of 2016, the population of the rural district was 4,329 in 1,430 households. The largest of its 12 villages was Onar, with 1,488 people.

References 

Meshgin Shahr County

Rural Districts of Ardabil Province

Populated places in Ardabil Province

Populated places in Meshgin Shahr County